The U.S. state of Montana first required its residents to register their motor vehicles and display license plates in 1913. , plates are issued by the Montana Department of Justice through its Motor Vehicle Division. Front and rear plates are required for most classes of vehicles, while only rear plates are required for motorcycles and trailers.

Passenger baseplates

1913 to 1975
The 1956 (dated 1957) issue was the first Montana license plate that complied with these standards.

1976 to present

Optional plates
All optional plates issued from 2003 onwards use an ABC123 serial format. Since 2012, this format has also been used on the Montana Centennial replica plate (above).

Before 2003

Non-passenger plates

Discontinued

County coding
Montana established a numeric county-code system for its license plates in 1934, which remains in use today (except on optional plates). With some exceptions, the order of the codes is based on the respective populations of the state's 56 counties according to the 1930 United States census.

References

External links
Montana license plates, 1969–present
License plates of Montana

Montana
Transportation in Montana
Montana transportation-related lists